John Popper (born March 29, 1967) is an American musician and songwriter, known as the co-founder, lead vocalist, and frontman of the rock band Blues Traveler.

Early life
John Popper was born in Chardon, Ohio. His father was a Hungarian immigrant who left Budapest in 1948. Through him, Popper is related to David Popper, a 19th-century European cellist whose many solo works for the cello are staples of the instrument's repertoire. Popper's mother and brother are lawyers.

Popper was raised in Stamford, Connecticut, New York, and New Jersey. He attended Davenport Ridge School, Stamford Catholic High School (now Trinity Catholic High School), and Princeton High School, from which he graduated in 1986. He took lessons on the piano, the cello, and the guitar, but none of those instruments appealed to him, and he hated being forced to practice.

He originally wanted to become a comedian, finding he could use humor to make friends and avoid bullies, but when he and a friend performed a routine as the Blues Brothers, he found that he enjoyed musical performance. From there, he took up the harmonica. Popper played trumpet in the Princeton High School Studio Jazz Band and convinced the teacher to let him play harmonica instead, after an in-class solo on the song "She Blinded Me with Science."

He formed several garage bands with friends in Princeton, New Jersey, one of which evolved into Blues Traveler in 1987. After graduating from high school, the group's members all moved to New York City, where Popper enrolled in the New School for Jazz and Contemporary Music, along with two of his bandmates as well as high school friend Chris Barron. Popper attended for three years but devoted himself to the band full-time once they signed a record contract, in 1990.

Career

Blues Traveler

Popper is a founding member of Blues Traveler, serving as the band's frontman with lead vocals and harmonica. For some songs, he forgoes the harmonica in favor of guitar, most often a 12-string acoustic. In addition, Popper has played the tin whistle on some recordings.

A prolific songwriter, he has composed the majority of the lyrics and music of Blues Traveler's songs.

The band grew a following with its extensive touring, sometimes with over 300 dates a year, and gained a reputation in the jam band scene of the 1990s. Blues Traveler crossed over into mainstream pop/rock radio success with their 1994 album, four, which garnered the group extensive media exposure. The Grammy Award for Best Rock Performance by a Duo or Group with Vocal in 1996 was awarded to "Run-Around", a song that Popper composed. In 2021, Blues Traveler's album "Traveler's Blues"  was nominated by the Recording Academy for "Best Traditional Blues Album" for the 2022 GRAMMY Awards.

Solo work
In 1990, Popper began to perform occasional solo concerts in addition to touring with Blues Traveler. Several songs that originated as Popper's solo pieces have become part of Blues Traveler's repertoire, and vice versa.

Bolstered by Blues Traveler's mainstream success, Popper released a solo album, Zygote, in 1999, and toured in support of it with his own John Popper Band. The album was produced by Terry Manning, and the backing band consisted of longtime friends Dave Ares, Crugie Riccio, and Rob Clores of Cycomotogoat, with drummer Carter Beauford of Dave Matthews Band. The album's release came less than three months after Popper's heart surgery, and only days after the death of Bobby Sheehan, Popper's bandmate and best friend. The subsequent tour was canceled midway due to poor ticket sales, and Popper instead took the time to focus on his health.

Popper has co-written songs with Trey Anastasio, Warren Haynes, Chris Barron, and Jonny Lang. He also frequently appears as a guest performer with musicians both famous and obscure, from a diverse variety of genres. He has performed with, among others, jam bands Spin Doctors, Dave Matthews Band, Phish, and most recently, the Allman Brothers Band in 2009; bluesmen Eric Clapton and B.B. King; singer-songwriters Jason Mraz and John Mayer; saxophonist Karl Denson; San Francisco's Culann's Hounds; heavy metal band Metallica; rock trio ZO2, and even with the Hungarian Ambassador to the United States, András Simonyi. He sat in with the Smashing Pumpkins on the second day of their acoustic 1997 Bridge School Benefit appearance, contributing harmonica for their song "Porcelina of the Vast Oceans"; Popper's solo garnered major applause from the audience. He also performed with the Grateful Dead at a tribute to Bill Graham in 1991. Popper played the harmonica on Hanson's album This Time Around in 2000, for which he performed on "If Only" and "In the City." He also composed, wrote, and performed the theme song for the ninth season of the sitcom Roseanne.

In 2017 and 2018, Popper began to play solo acoustic performances across the United States. He is often accompanied by Blues Traveler keyboardist Ben Wilson and performs songs that span both Blues Traveler and his solo catalog.

Side projects
In 1992, Popper conceived the HORDE Festival as a venue to gain exposure for up-and-coming independent musicians. It ran until 1998.

Popper was a part of a one-time studio band brought together in 1997 by New York drummer/songwriter Solomon Deniro. Other players included Trey Gunn, Bernie Worrell, Marc Ribot, and Vernon Reid. The group's only recordings were released as the album Gimme Gimme, under the name the Devotees. The same recording was re-released by Deniro in 2001, under the title Solomon.

Popper took over in 1998 as frontman of jam-band supergroup Frogwings, which then released the live album Croakin' at Toad's.

Popper later formed a rock/jazz/hip hop fusion group called the John Popper Project with DJ Logic, which released an album in 2006 and performs occasionally. He also performs on the 2008 album Jason Miles: Global Noize: A Prayer for the Planet.

Popper's latest side project is John Popper & the Duskray Troubadours, which plays Americana roots music. The group's self-titled debut from 429 Records was released in March 2011 and was produced by band member Jono Manson, who co-wrote much of the material. The first single, "Something Sweet", written by Manson and Bruce Donnola, was released February 7, 2011, on iTunes. Mason and Popper conceived the project after Popper says he was "running out of ideas" for Blues Traveler before they took a short break.

Acting and media appearances

Popper is known for singing the song "But Anyway" in the Farrelly Brothers comedy Kingpin, starring Woody Harrelson, Randy Quaid, and Vanessa Angel.

He had a speaking guest role in an episode of the sitcom Roseanne as a musician similar to himself. He appeared on episode 30 of Space Ghost Coast to Coast as a musical guest as well as featuring as a guest on the IFC television comedy series Z Rock. On the show, he plays himself and befriends the band, ZO2, helping them get a record deal. He also performed the Star-Spangled Banner prior to game 4 of the 1996 World Series.

Popper has provided narration for art projects produced by his friends, including Das Clown, an award-winning short film in slideshow style that was screened at the Sundance Film Festival.

He served as host of the third annual Jammy awards in 2002.

He has been a recurring guest on Howard Stern's and Bill Maher's shows and sat in with the CBS Orchestra on the Late Show with David Letterman on occasion. In 2009, he sat in with the Roots on an episode of Late Night with Jimmy Fallon. Popper performed "Something Sweet" with the Duskray Troubadours on the TBS show Lopez Tonight on March 1, 2011. He also sat in with the house band for the closing number of the show.

In 2016, Popper, along with the rest of Blues Traveler, made a cameo appearance in The Meddler.

In 2018, Popper appeared in the "Fully Vested" episode of Pawn Stars.

Personal life
Since the success of Blues Traveler, Popper has lived in various locations, including rural Pennsylvania and New Orleans. On November 23, 2015, Popper and his then-wife Jordan Auleb had their first child, a daughter; the couple divorced in 2018.

In October 1992, Popper was involved in a traffic collision on a motorcycle while traveling to a studio to record for Blues Traveler's third album. The crash put him in a wheelchair for several months, but Popper continued touring with the band performing in a wheelchair.

In 1999, he suffered a near-fatal heart attack brought on by years of compulsive overeating (he had been diagnosed with diabetes a few years earlier). Doctors at Cedars-Sinai Medical Center performed an emergency angioplasty, which saved Popper's life; he had 95% arterial blockage. Popper later underwent gastric bypass surgery and lost a significant amount of weight.

Popper has a tattoo across his chest that says "I WANT TO BE BRAVE", written backwards.

In August 2016, he announced a pending surgical procedure to repair collapsed vertebrae in his neck, necessitating the postponement and cancellation of some Blues Traveler shows.

Weapons collecting
Popper is an avid collector of weaponry, including firearms, swords, and a working $10,000 American Civil War cannon. He cites a fascination with their aesthetic of being "life-savingly efficient" machines. Popper is a supporter of Second Amendment rights and once appeared on an MTV-sponsored roundtable discussion on gun control, which included panelists from the Law Enforcement Alliance of America and Harvard's John F. Kennedy School of Government. He carries weapons in any state where it is allowed, even when onstage. On his 2003 Daily Show appearance, he stated that he decided to move away from New Jersey because of the state's tight gun laws. He said that his Bucks County, Pennsylvania property had  on which he built a private gun range.

Politics
Popper endorsed George W. Bush in the 2004 U.S. presidential election. In November 2008, Popper said, regarding Barack Obama, "this is the first time I've voted for a Democrat, ever." Popper was a supporter of Ron Paul during the 2012 U.S. presidential election, even participating in phone-banking at Ron Paul's New Hampshire campaign headquarters. He also played a short set during Ron Paul's "We are the Future Rally", an alternative convention for Paul supporters that was held in Tampa the day before the 2012 Republican National Convention.

Popper (with and without Blues Traveler) has played at conventions, fundraisers, and ceremonies for both Republican and Democratic politicians. 

Popper has said, "I was a bleeding-heart liberal, until I got a job," and describes himself as "a libertarian who is a Republican when pushed". The singer summed up his political position by saying, "I believe in freedom for markets and freedom for individuals, so I guess that makes me a libertarian."

Popper has toured with the USO, both with Blues Traveler and solo. In the mid-2000s, he toured the Middle East, performing with the Band of the Air Force Reserve and Jamie O'Neal at various military camps.

He has appeared with Rock the Vote and recorded "The Preamble" for the Schoolhouse Rocks the Vote! album.

Most recently, Popper performed the Blues Traveler hits "Run-Around" and "Hook", as well as a rendition of "The Star-Spangled Banner", alongside Greensky Bluegrass for Bernie Sanders' "A Future to Believe In" rally at Safeco Field in Seattle on March 25, 2016.

Religion
Popper was raised Catholic, and for a time attended Stamford Catholic High School in Connecticut. However, he does not actively practice in his adult life. He has described himself as a "recovering Catholic". He wrote the song "Trina Magna" as an exploration of his religious views. He also has Jewish ancestry through David Popper.

Legal trouble
In 2003, Popper was arrested for possession of marijuana. He was arrested again on March 6, 2007, near Ritzville, Washington, by the Washington State Patrol. He was the passenger in his own vehicle, which was stopped for speeding, and was found to be in the possession of a small amount of marijuana and weapons. Popper was released the same night. The vehicle had a stash of hidden compartments, which contained four rifles, nine handguns, a switchblade knife, a Taser, a set of brass knuckles, and night vision goggles. The vehicle was temporarily seized.

No charges were filed for the weapons, as they were all registered and securely locked away, and Popper was licensed to carry them, with the exception of the brass knuckles and switchblade knife, which he agreed to surrender. A deal was reached that allowed the marijuana charge to be dropped if Popper remained free of further drug infractions for one year and attended eight hours of drug counseling. Popper and the driver had been driving back to Washington from Austin, Texas, and Popper likes to visit gun ranges during long trips.

Online controversy
Popper is also known as an avid Twitter user and has caused some controversy on the platform. He also has publicly posted the home address and information of a particular Twitter user who often made jokes at his expense. Popper also drew attention for arguing with a bot named "assbott", which had become well-known during the 2016 presidential campaign of Donald Trump; it was the co-creator of this bot that Popper doxed in July 2017.

Autobiography
On March 29, 2016, Da Capo Press released Popper's autobiography, Suck and Blow: And Other Stories I'm Not Supposed to Tell, written by Popper with the help of Relix co-editor-in-chief Dean Budnick. In the book, among band exploits and a variety of topics, Popper discusses the group's rebound from the death of bassist Bobby Sheehan, the creation of the H.O.R.D.E. tour, his relationship with Bill Graham, and his personal battle with being overweight.

Equipment

John Popper has expressed a preference for the Hohner Special 20 brand blues harp, calling them "the Porsche of harmonicas." Since 2015, he uses mainly his own signature harmonicas, manufactured by Fender.
Popper uses Shure microphones and Mesa Boogie amplifiers. He also uses D'Addario strings.

Trademark equipment
Popper has developed some equipment innovations to accommodate his use of harmonicas during performances. Because each individual diatonic harmonica is tuned to one particular key, he fashioned belts with enough pockets to hold harmonicas in all twelve keys (plus extras) and wore them as a bandolier, or slung over his neck. He switches keys multiple times within one song, and this arrangement has allowed him to quickly trade one harmonica for another without looking. In 2002, he stopped using the belts, as they no longer fit him properly due to his weight loss. One such belt later sold for $2,700 on the History Channel series Pawn Stars. He now carries his harmonicas in a small black attaché case. He uses a special microphone with switches that change the audio effect of the harmonica as it is played through an amplifier, similar to a guitar effects pedal. Popper was inspired by Jimi Hendrix's guitar playing to make his instrument sound however he wanted.
He has fashioned a number of floppy-brimmed hats with flattened harmonica cover plates on the band, which he almost always wears during appearances with Blues Traveler.

Discography

Solo
 Zygote (1999)
 Go Outside and Drive (The Vestal Version) single (1999)

with Blues Traveler

with The Devotees
 Gimme Gimme (1997)

with Frogwings
 Croakin' at Toad's (2000)

with The John Popper Project
 The John Popper Project with DJ Logic (2006)

with The Duskray Troubadours
 John Popper & the Duskray Troubadours (2011)
 Something Sweet single (2011)

Featured music appearances
 Solo instrumental track "Harmonica Musings" from the soundtrack of Blues Brothers 2000 (1998)
 "The Preamble" from Schoolhouse Rocks the Vote! (1998)
 "Northbound Train" from the Broadway musical soundtrack of The Civil War: The Complete Work (1999)
 Duet with Eric Clapton on "Christmas Blues" from A Very Special Christmas Live (1999)
 "Regarding Steven" from the 2000 compilation VH1 Storytellers Live (2000)
 Duet with B.B. King on "Back Door Santa" from A Very Special Christmas Vol. 5 (2001)
 Several tracks from Warren Haynes Presents: The Benefit Concert, Volume 2 (2007)
 Several tracks from Warren Haynes Presents: The Benefit Concert, Volume 3 (2010)

Guest music appearances

Television appearances

 Performed a duet with Dolly Parton on her Treasures television special in 1997
 Appeared on a 1996 episode of the Late Show with David Letterman to surprise Manny the Hippie with a harmonica duel
 Appeared as a guest on an episode of the Cartoon Network comedy talk show Space Ghost Coast to Coast
 Had speaking lines on episode #9509 ("Of Mice and Dan") of the sitcom Roseanne as Stingray Wilson, a musician similar to Popper himself (Popper later wrote lyrics for the show's bluesy theme song, which was performed by Blues Traveler in the final season of the show).
 An animated clay caricature of Popper fought a match in the MTV series Celebrity Deathmatch, defeating singer Fiona Apple.
 Appeared on Penn and Teller's Sin City Spectacular, playing harmonica during a card trick performance
 Was a guest on Comedy Central's The Daily Show in 2003, promoting Blues Traveler's album Truth Be Told
 Was a celebrity coach in the final round of America's Got Talent
 Blues Traveler was a featured band on episode 8 ("Traumatic Party Stress Disorder") of season 1 of the Hulu TV romantic comedy TV series Selfie
 Appeared on season 9 of NBC's The Voice in 2015, with contestant Braiden Sunshine. Popper was "so honored" Sunshine used the song "Mountains Win Again" to audition with that he let him sing it for the crowd gathered at Las Vegas's Brooklyn Bowl on October 22, 2015.
 In January 2018, Popper appeared on A&E's Storage Wars (season 11, episode 17).
 In February 2018, he appeared on the History Channel's Pawn Stars (season 15, episode 20), where he authenticated a vest made for him and gave Chumlee a harmonica lesson.

Other appearances
 Popper performed with the Grateful Dead at the Laughter, Love and Music celebration of the life of Bill Graham in Golden Gate Park on November 3, 1991, playing harmonica on the Willie Dixon blues number "Wang Dang Doodle".
 Popper has played his Jimi Hendrix-inspired harmonica rendition of "The Star-Spangled Banner" at NBA, NFL, and MLB games, including the World Series (game 4 of the 1996 World Series at Atlanta–Fulton County Stadium in Atlanta, Georgia).

References

External links

 
 John Popper's biography at BluesTraveler.com (archived)
 John Popper collection at the Internet Archive's live music archive

1967 births
Living people
20th-century American singers
21st-century American singers
American harmonica players
American libertarians
American people of Czech descent
American people of Hungarian-Jewish descent
American rock singers
Blues Traveler members
Grammy Award winners
Musicians from Cleveland
Singers from New Jersey
Rock harmonica players
Interscope Records artists
People from Chardon, Ohio
People from Princeton, New Jersey
Princeton High School (New Jersey) alumni
20th-century American male singers
21st-century American male singers
Rainforest Band members